gela21 is a non-profit organization located in Talence in the campus of the École nationale supérieure d'architecture et de paysage de Bordeaux, France. Created in 2009, this student association works on pedagogical studies in consulting and planning in domains linked to the space design : architecture, landscape architecture, urban planning, environmental planning
...
All the projects are selected for a high environmental quality.

Activities 

Association gela21 works on these kinds of projects:
Consulting and Planning of residential architecture,
Consulting and Planning of gardens, parks, private and public open spaces...
 Computer Assisted Design and Presentation of technical plans, elevations and documents,
 Consulting and Analysis of regional and big-scaled landscapes

This organization participates to international competitions of architecture, design and urban planning.

gela21 publishes a zine, called gelaZINE, gathering articles about green architecture, sustainable landscape planning, interviews of architects and planners, discussions with other student associations in Europe...

Thanks to the international Erasmus system, gela21 develops a student network.
This organization became famous in March 2010 by coordinating a stand in a professional meeting where the students from different associations created a "speed-design".

Sources 

Student organizations in France